Irmologion is a liturgical book of the Eastern Orthodox Church and those Eastern Catholic Churches which follow the Byzantine Rite. It contains irmoi organised in sequences of odes (sg. ) and such a sequence was called canon ( 'law'). These canons of nine, eight, four or three odes are supposed to be chanted during the morning service (Orthros). The book Irmologion derives from heirmos which means 'link'. The  is a melodic model which preceded the composition of the odes.

The melodic irmos and the odes of the canon and its use during the morning service 

An important portion of Matins and other services in the Orthodox Church is the canon, a long liturgical poem divided into nine strophes with a sophisticated meter called ode. Each ode and its prosodic meter is made according to a certain irmos, and concerning its celebration during Orthros it is followed by troparia called . Sometimes certain longer irmoi are sung which are called katabasiai because of their descending melos. 

Since the Irmologion was invented as a chant book provided with musical notation, it only contained the smaller number of heirmoi with those texts which identified them.

Since the Byzantine period, there already developed a soloistic  way to perform just one certain ode during more important religious feast, if the celebration took more time than usual, but the genre became even more popular and innovative during the Ottoman period following the example of Balasios the Priest.

Organisation of the irmologion 
The earliest sources with heirmoi were the tropologion (Georgian , Armenian ) which organised hymns of different genres with modal signatures according to the calendar, beginning with the Christmas and Theophany cycle. The book irmologion developed not earlier than during the 10th century (GR-AOml Ms. β.32 is probably the oldest fully notated irmologion).

Within the Irmologion, the new chant book of the Stoudites' reform, the irmoi are usually arranged according to the eight tones of Byzantine chant either according to the odes (order of the odes, OdO, divided into eight parts according to the echoi, but within each echos all odes are ordered beginning with all first odes of each canon, all second or third odes etc.) or according to the canon (canon order, KaO, divided into eight parts according to the echoi, but the odes within each echos are organised according to the canon of each irmos).  

As example for the ode order (OdO), one might study the earlier irmologia of the Greek collection at the library of Saint Catherine's Monastery at the food of Mount Sinai: the manuscripts 929 and 1258 are organised, that the first, second, third, etc. odes are together. Since the second ode is only sung during Lent, there were much less second odes than first or third odes. 

As example for the canon order (KaO), one might study the very early fully notated manuscript of the Great Lavra on Mount Athos (GR-AOml Ms. β.32 written about 1000 with Chartres notation), the standard example for Coislin notation (F-Pn Ms. Coislin 220), or the later manuscripts of the Sinai collection (ET-MSsc Sin. gr.) such as Ms. 1256 and the first half of 1257. Here each ode has an ode number, such as ωδ α᾽ for the first ode, usually followed by a modal signature corresponding to the echos section. 

The next ode is mostly ωδ γ᾽ for the third ode, because according to the more common canon the second one is left out. Thus, one canon follows the preceding one until the order is fulfilled. These canons usually follow within each echos section according to the calendaric order. There is no real chronology between both orders, both existed already in the oldest heirmologia and they persisted until the current print editions. 

It also seems that the earlier manuscripts which still numbered the canons within the canon order, sorted them according to ascribed authors, Ms. Coislin 220 has also more or less concrete descriptions of the festive occasion, and still provides a choice of several canons in different echoi and composed by different authors for the very same feast. The number of canons is higher than in the later heirmologia of the 14th century, and it should be mentioned that certain schools like the one of Germanus I of Constantinople had been completely abandoned in the current print editions of the Orthodox church.

 
Concerning the Slavonic reception, first by Cyril and Methodius' students around Clement of Ohrid and Constantine of Preslav, the translators did not very close translations of the Greek hymns, they rather tried to preserve the sophisticated system of the melodic models such as avtomela and irmoi without changing the melodies. Within Slavonic manuscripts, the separation between Irmolog and the Oktoich and other books of the sticherarion was less common, usually the Oktoich books were so voluminous, since they included the irmoi (similar to the composition of the older tropologia which persisted until the 12th century), that they were separated into two volumes—one for Glas I-IV (the authentic modes) and a second for Glas V-VIII (the plagal modes). But there are irmologs provided with znamennaya notation since the 12th century—the Irmolog preserved at the Russian State Archive of Ancient Acts (RUS-Mda / ргада fond 381 Ms. 150), for instance. All Old Church Slavonic irmologs are organised in ode order.

Today the Irmologion is often replaced by another chant book which is called "Anthology of the Orthros" ( or ) which replaced the earlier Akolouthiai used since the 14th century. Some of these Anthologies do also contain the odes of the canon, but also many other hymns of the Psalterion (especially the more elaborated compositions the Polyeleos psalms) and of the book Octoechos which are sung during the morning service (Orthros, Utrenna). Already Codex sinaiticus graecus 1257 dating back to 1332, has a second part dedicated to the recitation of psalm verses (psalmody) during Orthros and Hesperinos, including the Polyeleoi.

These additional hymns sung during Orthros are:
 Antiphons which should not be confused with the Latin Antiphon (even if they are often reduced today to a few short troparia which were once sung as a refrain), since it is a rather elaborated form, usually organised in three sections (they usually follow the Great Ectenia at the beginning of the Divine Liturgy and of the Orthros)
 Dogmatica, hymns in honour of the Mother of God (Theotokos) which are also chanted during the Little Entrance of Vespers
 Theotokia, troparia in honour of the Mother of God, but not as specific as the Dogmatica
 Orthros psalm "Theos kyrios" (Ps. 117:27a) three times and Evlogetaria Anastasima in Echos Plagios Protos (Ps. 118:12)
 Troparia of the Resurrection in the eight tones
 The full text of the Polyeleos (Psalms 134 and 135; also Psalm 136, which is used during the Pre-Lenten Season), which is chanted at Matins on Sundays and feast days
 Songs of praise for feasts and saints
 Anabathmoi, or "Hymns of Ascent", based upon Psalms 119–133
 Prokeimena preceding the Gospel
 Doxologiai

History
The oldest manuscripts which contained canons, were tropologia which are composed according to a calendaric order. There were also types like the Georgian  and the Armenian Šaraknoc'. The book Irmologion was created later as a notated chant book by the reformers at the Stoudios Monastery, although not all Irmologia have musical notation. Concerning the traditional repertoire of these books, a Studites edition can be distinguished from the one at Sinai. 

The earliest notated Irmologion can be dated back to the 10th century in Byzantium. A full version of the Russian Irmologion, in Church Slavonic includes about 1050 irmoi.  

Earlier examples provided only the written text; later, the "hooks" and "banners" of Znamenny Chant were added above the text. Today, most Russian Irmologia are printed using modern musical notation (with the exception of some Old Believer communities, which continue to use the older znamenny neumes), although elsewhere, Byzantine musical notation is nearly universally used.

See also 
Andrew of Crete
Cosmas of Maiuma
John of Damascus
Joseph the Hymnographer
Octoechos system
Octoechos and parakletike
Sticherarion
Theodore the Studite
Theophanes the Branded

References

Chant books

Tropologia (6th to 12th centuries)

Office Menaia, Fasten and Flower Triod with Akrosticha

Slavic irmologs with znamennaya notation (12th to 16th centuries)

Slavic irmologs with kryuki notation (16th to 20th centuries)

Old Byzantine notation (10th to 13th centuries)

Middle Byzantine notation (13th to 19th centuries)

Without notation (10th to 18th centuries)

Chrysanthine notation (since 1814)

Editions

Studies

External links

Selections from the Irmologion (in English)

Eastern Orthodox liturgical books